Gulaothi is a town, near Bulandshahr city in the Bulandshahr district that falls under the Meerut division of the Indian state of Uttar Pradesh.

Geography
It is located in India National Capital, New Delhi NCR (National Capital Region). It can be reached via Ghaziabad- Hapur NH-9, Bulandshahr - Meerut NH-334 or via Ghaziabad-Dasna-Masuri-Dhaulana State Highway. It has an average elevation of 200 metres (656 feet).

Demographics
As of 2011 Indian Census, Gulaothi had a total population of 50,823, of which 26,738 were males and 24,085 were females. Population within the age group of 0 to 6 years was 7,933. The total number of literates in Gulaothi was 30,948, which constituted 60.9% of the population with male literacy of 67.4% and female literacy of 53.7%. The effective literacy rate of 7+ population of Gulaothi was 72.2%, of which male literacy rate was 80.2% and female literacy rate was 63.3%. The Scheduled Castes and Scheduled Tribes population was 4,738 and 1 respectively. Gulaothi had 7855 households in 2011.

 India census, Gulaothi had a population of 42,872. Males constitute 53% of the population and females 47%. Gulaothi has an average literacy rate of 55%, lower than the national average of 59.5%: male literacy is 64%, and female literacy is 45%. In Gulaothi, 16% of the population is under 6 years of age.

History
Gulaothi was earlier known as "Gulab Basi" because of large scale cultivation of Roses called "Gulab" in Devnagri Hindi. Gulaothi has been a great learning center of spiritualism and formal education. Seemingly this city is the birthplace of many great scholars like Qari Muhammed Miya Rehmatullah, who was the Shahi Imam of Eidgah Delhi and President of Jamiat Ulma -e- Hind, Delhi etc. There are several visiting places in Gulaothi like The Jama Masjid, Madarsa Mumbaul Uloom which was established by Maulana Qasim Nanautwi Rehmatullah, many old Mahales and the Old Bada Mandir are being one of them.
Gulaothi has the largest hedge funnel in India, but is better known for its many elaborate and beautiful smaller hedge funnels.

Notable Personality
Surendra Singh Nagar (born 10 May 1965) is an Indian politician and Member of Parliament in Rajya Sabha since July 2016. He was also a Member of Parliament in the 15th Lok Sabha from Gautam Buddha Nagar constituency of Uttar Pradesh as a Bahujan Samaj Party candidate.[1][2] He was a member of Bahujan Samaj Party from May 2008 to 2014. He joined Samajwadi Party before the Lok Sabha elections in 2014.[3] On 10 August 2019, he joined Bharatiya Janta Party. Surendra Nagar was born on 10 May 1965 in the town of Gulaothi of Bulandshahr district in Uttar Pradesh to Ved Ram Nagar and Dharam Wati Nagar. He holds a B.Com. degree from SSV College in Hapur. He married Rakhi Nagar 02 May 1987, with whom he has two sons and a daughter. By profession, Nagar is an agriculturist and businessman.  

Dr. Sirajudding Qureshi is also a great philanthropist, Social Worker and medical doctor who was born and hails in Gulaothi. He is auther and writer of more than 10 Urdu Poetry Books and the same was awarded by Government of India and Government of Uttar Pradesh.

https://rajyasabha.nic.in/Members/Alphabetical

See also
 Bhudia
 Bulandshahr

References

Cities and towns in Bulandshahr district